D530 connects the A4 motorway Ludbreg interchange to the D2 state road, near village of Zamlaka providing access to the motorway from Koprivnica, Ludbreg and Varaždin.

The road, as well as all other state roads in Croatia, is managed and maintained by Hrvatske ceste, state owned company.

Traffic volume 

The D530 state road traffic volume is not reported by Hrvatske ceste, however they regularly count and report traffic volume on the A4 motorway Ludbreg interchange, which connects to the D530 road only, thus permitting the D530 road traffic volume to be accurately calculated. The report includes no information on ASDT volumes.

Road junctions and populated areas

Maps

Sources

See also
 A4 motorway

State roads in Croatia
Varaždin County